Aviva Chiara Mongillo (born February 6, 1998), also known as Carys, is a Canadian pop singer and actress. She is known for her roles as Alya Kendrick in the Family Channel drama Backstage and Juniper in the CBC sitcom Workin' Moms. After the online success of "Princesses Don't Cry", she released the EP To Anyone Like Me on October 2, 2020, through Warner Music Canada.

Early life
Aviva Chiara Mongillo was born on February 6, 1998, in Markham, Canada. She was born into an Italian family, who she stated "always supported" her dreams. At the age of seven, she was enrolled in acting classes, followed by vocal lessons and guitar classes. She attended Unionville High School, and continued her education while appearing on Backstage. Mongillo has suffered from anxiety from a young age.

Career
Whilst attending Unionville High School, Mongillo posted a number of original songs to SoundCloud. They caught the attention of a music producer in Toronto, who invited her to a recording studio there. She worked with the songwriters, and a month into her time there, they informed her that the music was being made for Backstage. They told her that she should audition for a role on the series, and she was cast as Alya Kendrick. She portrayed the role for sixty episodes. In June 2016, Mongillo released her debut single, "Hype". The single was accompanied by a music video. On September 15, 2017, her debut EP, Songs About Boys, was released. The EP received promotion from Family Channel, Backstages network. In 2017, she appeared in Don't Talk to Irene, a Canadian comedy film.

In 2018, Mongillo began portraying the recurring role of Juniper in the CBC sitcom Workin' Moms. In 2019, she appeared in the film Long Shot, playing a teenage version of Charlize Theron's character, as well as making an appearance in the slasher film Random Acts of Violence. Later in 2019, she began performing under the stage name Carys, with the single "Bad Boy" released on July 26, 2019. In August 2019, "Princesses Don't Cry", a song from the Songs About Boys EP, became a sleeper hit after going viral on social networking app TikTok. Over 850,000 videos were made using the song, which was later rereleased as a single under her stage name. She stated that when the song began to gain traction, she was perplexed since she wanted Carys to be a character that she could feel "removed from", and did not want to be seen as vulnerable. She then became grateful for the opportunity to become vulnerable with her music. The music video for "Princesses Don't Cry" was released on November 12, 2019. In June 2020, "No More" was released as her next single, accompanied by a music video. On August 28, 2020, she released the single "Crush", and announced that her debut EP as Carys, To Anyone Like Me, would be released on October 2, 2020. Upon the release of To Anyone Like Me, the song "When a Girl" was released as a single, with an accompanying music video.

Filmography

Discography

Extended plays

Singles

References

External links
 

1998 births
Living people
21st-century Canadian actresses
21st-century Canadian women singers
Canadian child actresses
Canadian film actresses
Canadian people of Italian descent
Canadian television actresses
People from Markham, Ontario